Emu Vale is a rural town and locality in the Southern Downs Region, Queensland, Australia.

History 
The town takes its name from the Emu Vale railway station on the Killarney railway line, which is believed to be named after an early pastoral run.

Emu Vale Provisional School opened on 2 February 1876. It became Emu Vale State School on 20 January 1879. It was closed on 31 December 2003. The school was located on the triangle of land bounded by Yangan Killarney Road, Swift Road and Emu Creek. The school's website was archived.

Land in Emu Vale was open for selection on 17 April 1877;  were available.

The contract to build the first section was given to John Garget on 22 November 1881, but progress was delayed when the Queensland Railway Department was unable to provide the locomotives and wagons need to carry the construction materials. The first section to Emu Vale railway station opened on 2 June 1884. It was officially opened with a train from Warwick decorated with flags and greenery with several hundred passengers on board. The second section of the railway from Emu Vale to Killarney railway station was also built by Garget and completed on 22 August 1885.

In 1898 the Post and Telegraph and Postal Note Office hitherto known as Neereeadah was changed to Emu Vale.

Rocky Mountain Provisional School opened on 1919 and closed circa 1920.

By 1931 the Holy Redeemer Catholic Church had been established.

The Emu Vale Memorial Hall was officially opened on Saturday 28 May 1954 by Sir Raymond Huish.

Community groups 
The Emu Vale branch of the Queensland Country Women's Association meets at the Emu Vale Memorial Hall at 559 Yangan Killarney Road.

References

External links 

 

Towns in Queensland
Southern Downs Region
Localities in Queensland